Ancylobacter vacuolatus is a bacterium from the family of Xanthobacteraceae which has been isolated from soil.

References

Further reading

External links
Type strain of Ancylobacter vacuolatus at BacDive -  the Bacterial Diversity Metadatabase

Hyphomicrobiales
Bacteria described in 2006